Articles on VSCF (variable-speed constant-frequency) include:

 Constant speed drive
 Tap converter